Chim Chim Cheree is an album by tenor saxophonist Eric Alexander. It was recorded in 2009 and released by Venus Records in the following year.

Recording and music
The album was recorded at the Avatar Studio in New York on October 3, 2009. It was produced by Tetsuo Hara and Todd Barkan. The four musicians are tenor saxophonist Eric Alexander, pianist Harold Mabern, bassist John Webber, and drummer Joe Farnsworth. The material is compositions by saxophonist John Coltrane and other pieces associated with him.

Release and reception
Chim Chim Cheree was released by Venus Records in 2010. The IAJRC Journal reviewer concluded that Alexander's "tackling of the Coltrane oeuvre should have been of considerable interest. Except for a few instances, the results are a bit flat."

Track listing
"You Don't Know What Love Is"
"Dear Lord"
"On a Misty Night"
"Chim Chim Cheree"
"Pursuance"
"Afro Blue"
"The Night Has a Thousand Eyes"
"Wise One"

Personnel
Eric Alexander – tenor saxophone
Harold Mabern – piano
John Webber – bass
Joe Farnsworth – drums

References

2010 albums
Eric Alexander (jazz saxophonist) albums
Venus Records albums